[[File:24 in gauge railway of Mr. Fernando de Teresa in Calle Gealti N° 29, in Tacubaya, Mexico City with a 5hp 0-4-0WT Arnold Jung (N° 255 of 1896), and Baldwin 4-4-0 20hp called 'Susana' (N° 15241 of March 1897).jpg|thumb|24 gauge railway of Mr. Fernando de Teresa in Calle Gealti N° 29, in Tacubaya, Mexico City with a 5hp 0-4-0WT Arnold Jung (N° 255 of 1896), and Baldwin 4-4-0 20hp called 'Susana' (N° 15241 of March 1897)]]

The line was built by Fernando de Teresa in 1896. The locomotives were smaller than those used at Disneyland. The first locomotive was based on Decauville equipment; and the second, a 6-ton 4-4-0, was the smallest ever built by Baldwin for commercial purposes. The line was converted to part of Mexico City's standard gauge electric tramway system in 1910.

Locomotives

References 

 
 
 

600 mm gauge railways in Mexico
Railway companies established in 1896
Railway companies disestablished in 1910
1910 disestablishments in Mexico
Mexican companies established in 1896